The Concerto for Orchestra is an orchestral composition by the American composer Marc Neikrug.  The work was commissioned by the New York Philharmonic and was completed in May 2011.  It was given its world premiere by the New York Philharmonic under the conductor Alan Gilbert at Avery Fisher Hall on April 26, 2012.  The concerto is dedicated to Alan Gilbert.

Composition
The Concerto for Orchestra has a duration of roughly 30 minutes and is composed in three movements:
First movement
Scherzo
Adagio

Neikrug described the piece in the score program notes, writing, "It is meant to feature the great virtuoso orchestra. While the composition is rigorously structured from basic unifying elements, it is intended as a show piece. The musical core of the piece is a series of chords constructed from expanding intervals. These same expanding intervals form the basis of the melodic structure of the piece."

Instrumentation
The work is scored for an orchestra comprising three flutes (3rd doubling piccolo), three oboes (3rd doubling cor anglais), three clarinets (3rd doubling bass clarinet), three bassoons, four horns, three trumpets, two trombones, bass trombone, tuba, timpani, three percussionists, harp, celesta, and strings.

Reception
Allan Kozinn of The New York Times gave the Concerto for Orchestra modest praise, writing:
Kozinn nevertheless added:

References

Compositions by Marc Neikrug
2011 compositions
Neikrug
Music commissioned by the New York Philharmonic